Commons Act is a stock short title used in the United Kingdom for legislation relating to commons.

List
Acts of the Parliament of England
The Commons Act 1236
The Commons Act 1285

Acts of the Parliament of the United Kingdom
The Commons Act 1876
The Commons Act 1899
The Commons Registration Act 1965
The Commons Act 2006

The Metropolitan Commons Acts 1866 to 1878 is the collective title of the following Acts:
The Metropolitan Commons Act 1866 (29 & 30 Vict c 122)
The Metropolis Commons Amendment Act 1869 (32 & 33 Vict c 107)
The Metropolitan Commons Act 1878 (41 & 42 Vict c 71)

See also
List of short titles

References

Lists of legislation by short title
Law of the United Kingdom